Mighty Servant can refer to:
Mighty Servant 1, a heavy-lift ship
Mighty Servant 2, a heavy-lift ship
Mighty Servant 3, another heavy-lift ship
Mighty Servant of Leuk-o, an artifact in the Dungeons & Dragons fantasy campaign setting Greyhawk